Allied Communication Procedures is the set of manuals and supplements published by the Combined Communications Electronics Board that prescribe the methods and standards to be used while conducting visual, audible, radiotelegraph, and radiotelephone communications within NATO member nations. These procedures relate to procedure words, radiotelephony procedure, Allied Military phonetic spelling alphabets, plain language radio checks, the 16-line message format (radiogram), and others.

Current procedures 
Throughout the Cold War, the list of procedures was extensive (see Combined Communications Electronics Board#Allied Communications Publications), but has been pared down to simplify the training required of communications personnel and others who must know the procedures.

References 

Military communications
Military standardization